A list of American films released in 1910.

See also
 1910 in the United States

References

External links

1910 films at the Internet Movie Database

1910
Films
Lists of 1910 films by country or language
1910s in American cinema